RRC may stand for the following:

Military units
 Regimental Reconnaissance Company, within the 75th Ranger Regiment of the U.S. Army, established in 1984
 Royal Regiment of Canada, a Canadian Army regiment established in 1862
 Royal Rifles of Canada, a Canadian Army regiment active from 1862 to 1966

Organizations
 Railroad Commission of Texas
 Range Resources, an American natural gas exploration and production company (NYSE: RRC)
 Reconstructionist Rabbinical College in Wyncote, Pennsylvania
 Regional Radiocommunication Conference of the International Telecommunication Union
 Relief and Rehabilitation Commission of Ethiopia
 Road Runners Club (UK), an association formed in 1952
 Rubber Reserve Company, pre-World War II US government agency that stockpiled reserves of natural rubber
 Rules and Referee Committee, of the Federation of International Bandy

Technology
 Radio Resource Control, a concept and a protocol name for a set of control messages
 Rolling resistance coefficient
 Root-raised-cosine filter, used in digital communication systems

Other uses
 Roman Republican Coinage, a reference work on Roman Republican currency written by Michael H. Crawford
 Royal Red Cross, a United Kingdom and Commonwealth military decoration; recipients may use the postnominal "RRC"

See also

 
 RC (disambiguation)
 R2C (disambiguation)